The 2023 NRFL Leagues is the 59th and 57th seasons respectively of the NRFL Championship and NRFL Conference,  football competitions in New Zealand. Established in 1965, currently twelve teams compete in the Championship while 8 teams compete in the Northern and Southern sections of the Conference League.

Northern League 

The Northern League sits above the two NRFL Divisions and is also overseen by Northern Region Football, despite being run by New Zealand Football as part of the New Zealand National League.

Twelve teams are competing in the league – the top ten teams from the previous season and the two teams promoted from the 2022 NRFL Division 1. The promoted teams are West Coast Rangers and Manurewa. This is both Manurewa's first season in the Northern League. West Coast have returned at the first time of asking after being relegated in 2021. They replaced Waiheke United (one season) and North Shore United (two seasons).

Northern League table

Championship

Championship teams 
Twelve teams are competing in the league – eight teams from the previous season, the two teams relegated from the 2022 Northern League and two teams promoted from the 2022 NRFL Division 2. The relegated teams are Waiheke United and North Shore United, while the promoted teams are Hibiscus Coast and Ngaruawahia United. West Coast Rangers were promoted alongside Manurewa, while Albany United and Waitemata were relegated.

Championship personnel and kits

Championship table

Championship results table

Northern Conference

Northern Conference teams 
Eight teams are competing in the league – the top six northern teams from Division 2 last season and the two teams relegated from the 2022 NRFL Division 1. The relegated teams are Albany United and Waitemata. Although Central United won the 2022 NRF Championship, they were unable to be promoted due to their MoU with Auckland City. As a result, Oratia United were reprieved of relegation.

Northern Conference table

Northern Conference results table

Southern Conference

Southern Conference teams 
Eight teams are competing in the league – the top two southern teams from Division 2 last season, and the top 6 from the 2022 WaiBOP Premiership.

Southern Conference table

Southern Conference results table

References

NRFL Championship
NRFL Conference
2022–23 in New Zealand association football
New Zealand